Flower Forest Botanical Gardens is a horticultural park and tourist attraction near the village of Bloomsbury, Saint Joseph in Barbados. It is a scenic garden park with attractive flowering plants and tropical trees. The  property was formerly a sugar plantation.

History  
Richmond Plantation was redeveloped in the 1980s to become a botanical and tourism resource by a diverse group, notably Don Hill (Barbados Telephone Company), Will Huey (RSPCA), Bertie Graham (Paredos), Richard Coghlan (Layout of the Sandy Lane Hotel grounds, Trevena Gardens), Peter Gilkes (Printersco).

The gardens were purchased from the founding shareholders in 2009 and continue to be a sustainable agricultural development mainly in tourism, privately owned by David Spieler. An amicable transfer, the takeover has allowed many improvements to be initiated.

Botany 
Collections of Heliconias, ginger lilies, bromeliads, anthurium lilies, and other tropical flowers presently provide a flowering base underneath tall, indigenous Caribbean Royal palms, which grow wild in the Scotland District of Barbados.

Gardeners 
In 2019 Flower Forest employs 4 full-time gardeners, 2 pavilion staff members, and is managed by Angela Hurdle. It is the largest garden in Barbados.

See also
 Andromeda Botanic Gardens
 Welchman Hall Gully
 Hunte's Gardens
 Orchid World

References 

Saint Joseph, Barbados
Gardens in Barbados
Parks in Barbados
Botanical gardens in Barbados